The capital of Germany is the  city state of Berlin. It is the seat of the President of Germany, whose official residence is Schloss Bellevue. The Bundesrat ("federal council") is the representation of the Federal States (Bundesländer) of Germany and has its seat at the former Prussian Herrenhaus (House of Lords). Though most of the ministries are seated in Berlin, some of them, as well as some minor departments, are seated in Bonn, the former capital of West Germany.

History

Pre-1871
Prior to 1871, Germany was not a unified nation-state, and had no capital city. The medieval German Holy Roman Empire used to have Aachen as its preferred seat of government during Charlemagne's reign, and until 1531 it was the place where 31 Holy Roman Emperors were crowned Kings of the Germans. The coronation later moved to Frankfurt. However, after Charlemagne, none of the subsequent Holy Roman Emperors moved to Aachen or Frankfurt, instead retaining their own original constituent kingdom or principality as base or moving into temporary Royal palaces dotted around the confederate realm known as Kaiserpfalz. The last imperial ruling house (the  Habsburgs) had Vienna as its permanent seat of government.

After the Congress of Vienna created the formal German Confederation in 1815, a Federal Assembly convened at the Free City of Frankfurt, representing not the people of the individual German Lands but their sovereigns. Subsequently, Frankfurt briefly became the official German capital during the short-lived Revolutions of 1848 in the German states.

1871–1945
It was only during the 1871 unification of Germany that the newly unified German Reich was first assigned an official capital. Since Berlin was the capital of Prussia, the leading state of the new Reich, it became the capital of Germany as well.  Berlin had been the capital of Prussia and its predecessor, Brandenburg, since 1518.  Berlin remained the capital of the German Reich until 1945. However, for a period of a few months following the First World War, the national assembly met in Weimar because civil war was ravaging Berlin. After the capture of Berlin in 1945, Flensburg briefly served as capital. Germany was then occupied by the Allies as the outcome of World War II, and Berlin ceased to be the capital of a sovereign German state.

1945–1990

In 1949, with sovereignty regained the country split up into West Germany and East Germany. Berlin was also divided, into West Berlin and East Berlin.  Originally, Frankfurt was to be the provisional capital of West Germany. However, West German authorities intended to make Berlin the capital if Germany were ever reunified.  They feared that since Frankfurt was a major city in its own right, it would ultimately be accepted as a permanent capital and weaken West German support for reunification.  For this reason, the capital was located in the smaller university city of Bonn as a more obviously provisional solution. Another factor was that Bonn is close to Cologne, the hometown of West Germany's first chancellor, Konrad Adenauer. East Germany claimed East Berlin as its capital, even though Berlin as a whole was still legally occupied territory, and would remain so for 45 years.

1990–present
In 1990, with the reunification of Germany, Berlin was also reunified and became the capital of the enlarged Federal Republic of Germany.  There was some debate, however, on whether the seat of government should move to Berlin.  Many believed that Bonn should remain the seat of government – a situation analogous to that of the Netherlands, where Amsterdam is the capital but The Hague is the seat of government.  In 1991, after an emotional debate, the Bundestag voted to move the seat of government to Berlin by 1999. However, six ministries remained in Bonn, each with a second office in Berlin.

See also
 Decision on the Capital of Germany

External links
 New York Times article about Bonn and Berlin federal administration
 Official website of the Parliament of Germany

Government of Germany
Germany